Fantasy Software, which started out as Quest Microsoftware, was one of the smaller software companies which produced games for home computers, mainly the ZX Spectrum during the early 1980s. The company was founded in early 1983 by Bob Hamilton and Paul Dyer. It had a number of reasonable successes in the early days of the computer boom but never became one of the major software production houses. Most of its releases were written by Bob Hamilton.

List of games
 The Black Hole (1983) (as Quest)
 Violent Universe (1983) (as Quest)
 Doomsday Castle (1983) — reviewed in Crash issue 2: 87%
 The Pyramid (1983) — reviewed in Crash issue 2: 83%
 Beaky and the Egg Snatchers (1984) — reviewed in Crash issue 7: 75%
 Backpackers Guide to the Universe (1984) — reviewed in Crash issue 12: 83%
 The Drive-In (1984) — reviewed in Crash issue 13: 70%

History
 In issue 19 of Crash magazine, they stated that a number of companies owed advertising fees including Fantasy Software, with a debt of £4,190.

References 

Video game companies established in 1983
Defunct video game companies of the United Kingdom